Rivington's Theological Library was a series of 15 volumes, edited by William Rowe Lyall and Hugh James Rose, and published in London during the 1830s by Rivington's. Rose as founder intended "to restore in England the tradition of the primitive church and revive a taste for patristic studies." His quest for contributors took him to Oxford in 1832, at a pivotal moment for what would become the Tractarian movement.

A work by John Henry Newman, The Arians of the Fourth Century (1833), was intended for the Library. Lyall, however, had objections, to its theology and its scope (Newman had been assigned the topic of Church Councils of the period), and it was published by Rivingtons, but outside the Library. Rose told Newman privately that the series was playing too safe, and was not making its mark. A further work, commissioned from Joseph Blanco White, and announced as a History of the Inquisition, as Newman's had been intended as a History of the Principal Councils, took its own way, and became a work Observations on Heresy and Orthodoxy (1835) with a Unitarian aspect. Other announced volumes, by Rose on Martin Luther, and by James Nichols on Hugo Grotius, did not appear in the series.

Notes

Series of books
1830s books
Theology books